The 2020 Women's European Water Polo Championship was the 18th edition of the major European water polo tournament for national teams. It was held at the Danube Arena in Budapest, Hungary, from 12 to 25 January 2020.

Spain defeated Russia 13–12 in the final to win their second title.

Host
LEN announced the choice of Budapest as host for the competition on 9 July 2016. All the matches were played at the Danube Arena.

Qualification

Twelve teams were allowed to the tournament. The qualification was as follows:
 The host nation
 The best five teams from the 2018 European Championships
 Six teams from the qualifiers

Format
The twelve teams were split in two groups with six teams each. The first four teams of each group played each other in the quarterfinals in cross group format, the remaining teams played for places nine to twelve.

Squads

Draw
The draw of the preliminary round's pools took place in Budapest on 22 October 2019. The teams were drawn into two groups of six. The first batch included the best two teams of the previous edition; the teams ranked third and fourth were in the second batch, the fifth and the sixth in the third batch and the qualification winners in the fourth batch.

With the play-offs winners determined on 26 October, the draw resulted in the following groups:

Preliminary round
All times are local (UTC+1).

Group A

Group B

Knockout stage

Bracket

5th place bracket

Quarterfinals

5–8th place semifinals

Semifinals

Finals

Eleventh place game

Ninth place game

Seventh place game

Fifth place game

Bronze medal game

Gold medal game

Final standing

1 Spain qualified for the Olympics by finishing second in the 2019 World Championships.

Statistics and awards

Top goalscorers

Source: wp2020budapest.microplustiming.com

Top goalkeepers

Source: wp2020budapest.microplustiming.com

Awards
The awards were announced on 26 January 2020.

References

External links
Official website

Women
Women's European Water Polo Championship
International water polo competitions hosted by Hungary
European Championship
European Water Polo Championship
European Water Polo Championship
2020 in Hungarian women's sport